Westerkappeln is a municipality in the district of Steinfurt, in North Rhine-Westphalia, Germany. It is situated approximately 15 km north-west of Osnabrück.

References

Steinfurt (district)